Villeneuve is a rural town and locality in the Somerset Region, Queensland, Australia.

Geography
A section of the northern boundary of Villeneuve follows the D'Aguilar Highway.

History

The town is named after the railway station, which in turn took its name from Frank Villeneuve Nicholson, owner of the property Villeneuve.

Farming was established at Villeneuve in the late 1870s.

Villeneuve Provisional School opened on 30 May 1887 with a new building erected in 1888 which it shared with the Anglican Church. In 1902, it was renamed West Vale Provisional School. It was temporarily closed between September 1907 and July 1908 due to poor student numbers. It closed permanently in February 1910.

St Barnabas' Anglican Church was dedicated on Sunday 2 September 1888 by local rector Reverend J.F. Leighton. It occupied shared premises with the provisional school with the school room being the nave of the church with a chancel being added for church services. It closed circa 1961.

As a result of the creation of the Somerset Dam, much of Villeneuve is now underwater.

References

Further reading

External links 
 

Suburbs of Somerset Region
Towns in Queensland
Localities in Queensland